WMLR (1230 AM) is a radio station broadcasting an oldies format. Licensed to Hohenwald, Tennessee, United States, the station is currently owned by Grace Broadcasting Services, Inc. and features programming from Citadel Media.

References

External links

MLR
Oldies radio stations in the United States
Lewis County, Tennessee